Upper Centennial Parkway is a mountain-access road in Hamilton, Ontario, Canada. Also known as Hamilton Highway 20, the road begins at its north end at Centennial Parkway in the Lower City of Hamilton beside Battlefield Park, and extends south up the Niagara Escarpment and southward across the mountain where it ends at Rymal Road. It is a two-way street throughout.  South of Rymal Road, it continues as Regional Road 56.

It is named Upper Centennial Parkway because it is in alignment with Centennial Parkway in Lower City Hamilton.

Landmarks
Note: Listing of landmarks from North to South.
 Battlefield Park
 Canadian Pacific railway line
 Bruce Trail
 Niagara Escarpment

Communities
Note: Listing of neighbourhoods from North to South. 
 Gershome
 Heritage Green
 Leckie Park
 Elfrida

Roads that cross Upper Centennial Parkway
Note: Listing of streets from North to South.
 Green Mountain Road, West/East
 Mud Street, West/East
 Highland Road, West/East
 Rymal Road East

References

MapArt Golden Horseshoe Atlas - Page 648, 658 - Grids J21, J22, K22, L22, M22, N22, P22

External links
Google Maps: Upper Centennial Parkway (Hybrid)

Roads in Hamilton, Ontario